Teri is a given name.

Teri may also refer to:

 Teri, Khyber Pakhtunkhwa, a village and Union Council in Karak District, Pakistan
 Teri, Leh, a village in India
 Teries, people from Hawick, Scotland
 The Energy and Resources Institute (TERI), an Indian research institute
 TERI University, India
 Teri (geology), a coastal dune complex in southeastern India

See also
 Terri
 Terry (disambiguation)
 Teresa (disambiguation)